Madagasikara zazavavindrano is a species of gastropods belonging to the family Pachychilidae.

The species is found in Madagascar.

Per IUCN, the species has the status "critically endangered".

References

Pachychilidae